Karine Plantadit (born January 15, 1970) is a dancer and performer. She was born in France and raised in Cameroon. She moved to Cannes at age 14 to study dance. She subsequently moved to New York City to study dance with Alvin Ailey.

Plantadit was nominated in 2010 for a Tony Award in the category of Best Featured Actress in a Musical for her playing the role of Kate in the musical Come Fly Away.  She was also in Saturday Night Fever, The Lion King, Movin' Out and Frida.

References

External links

Living people
French musical theatre actresses
1970 births
French emigrants to the United States
French female dancers